Cornelis Jacobus Snijders (29 September 1852 - 26 May 1939) was a Dutch military leader. He was born in Nieuwe Tonge on 29 September 1852. In 1865 he went to study in Middelburg but did not finish his education there. 1869 he joined the Royal Military Academy in Breda, becoming an engineer. In 1883 he married Johanna Adriana Everdina. On 1 July 1910 he was made chief of the general staff. He was a proponent of military aviation. In 1913 Snijders created the Aviation Department. Later the navy received an airforce as well. Snijders was also First Chairman of the Dutch Association for Aviation. When tensions grew in anticipation of World War I he was made Commander-in-Chief of the Armed Forces. Shortly after he was promoted to full general. In April 1918, one month after the signing of the Treaty of Brest-Litovsk which freed Germany on her Eastern Front, he opposed war with Germany, making clear that if war was to be fought he preferred to fight the Entente. He died in Hilversum on 26 May 1939.

Military decorations
  Knight fourth class of the Military Order of William (1875)
  Knight Grand Cross of the Order of the Netherlands Lion (Knight 1894, Knight Grand Cross 1919)
  Grand Officer of the Order of Orange-Nassau (1914)
  Expedition Cross (1877)
  Officers' Cross (XLV) (1887)
  Cross of Merit of the Netherlands Red Cross
  Atjeh Medal
  Mobilisation Cross 1914-1918 (1925)
  Cross of Merit for the national committee "Mobilisation Cross 1914-1918"
  Knight Grand Cross of the Order of the Crown
  Knight first class of the Order of the Gold Lion of the House of Nassau (1919)
  Commander of the Order of St. Olav
  Knight first class of the Order of the Red Eagle
  Commander of the Order of the Sword
  Officer of the Order of the Crown

See also 
 Hendrik Sacré
 Izaak Reijnders
 Bonifacius Cornelis de Jonge
 Alliance for National Reconstruction

References

Further reading
 Van den Berg, D. (1945) Cornelis Jacobus Snijders (1852-1939). Een leven in dienst van zijn land en zijn volk. (In Dutch)

1852 births
1939 deaths
Commanders-in-chief of the Armed Forces of the Netherlands
Royal Netherlands Army generals